Chrysomantis tessmanni is a species of praying mantis.

See also
List of mantis genera and species

References

Acromantinae